Gymnastics events were competed at the 1998 South American Games in Cuenca, Ecuador.

Medal summary

Medal table

Artistic gymnastics

Men

Women

Rhythmic gymnastics

References 

South American Games
1998 South American Games
1998 South American Games